is a video game for the Nintendo 64, released in 1999. The game is based on the Goemon series and despite the series' relative popularity in the west for the system, the game was released only in Japan.

The game is based on the Japanese board game Sugoroku, with added combat and card play elements. The game is populated with Konami's array of Ganbare Goemon characters including Goemon, Ebisumaru, Sasuke, Yae, and more. The game is played on pre-rendered boards that resemble previous locations in the Ganbare Goemon series.

The game features Yae's new outfit that would be used in subsequent titles. In addition, characters from Rakugakids were added as battlecards.

External links

1999 video games
Ganbare Goemon games
Japan-exclusive video games
Nintendo 64 games
Nintendo 64-only games
Video games based on board games
Video games developed in Japan

Multiplayer and single-player video games